Giorgio Vallebuona (born 24 April 1960) is a Chilean rower. He competed in the men's eight event at the 1984 Summer Olympics.

References

1960 births
Living people
Chilean male rowers
Olympic rowers of Chile
Rowers at the 1984 Summer Olympics
Place of birth missing (living people)
Pan American Games medalists in rowing
Pan American Games silver medalists for Chile
Rowers at the 1983 Pan American Games
20th-century Chilean people